The 2016 Deutsche Tourenwagen Masters was the thirtieth season of premier German touring car championship and also seventeenth season under the moniker of Deutsche Tourenwagen Masters since the series' resumption in 2000.  The season started on 7 May at Hockenheim, and ended on 16 October at the same venue. Marco Wittmann won his 2nd DTM championship after a total of nine events.

Rule changes for 2016

Technical
The Balance of Performance DTM car weights were revised to improve racing spectacle.

Teams and drivers
The following manufacturers, teams and drivers competed in the 2016 Deutsche Tourenwagen Masters. All teams competed with tyres supplied by Hankook.

Driver changes
 Entering DTM
 2015 GP3 Series champion and Mercedes DTM reserve driver Esteban Ocon made his DTM debut with Mercedes-Benz.

 Leaving DTM
 2015 DTM champion Pascal Wehrlein left the series to race in Formula One with Manor Racing.

Mid-season changes
 Adrien Tambay was injured in the first race of Round 5 with René Rast replacing him for race 2. 　
 After Round 5, Esteban Ocon left the DTM to race in Formula One with Manor Racing. He was replaced by 2015 European Formula 3 champion and Mercedes DTM reserve driver Felix Rosenqvist.
 René Rast replaced Mattias Ekström at Hockenheim for the final round. After that he and Mike Rockenfeller were swapped in the team.

Calendar
The nine event calendar was announced on 30 November 2015. Oschersleben was officially removed from calendar.

Championship standings
Scoring system
Points were awarded to the top ten classified finishers as follows:

Drivers' championship

† — Driver retired, but was classified as they completed 75% of the winner's race distance.

Manufacturers' championship

Teams' championship

References

External links
  

Deutsche Tourenwagen Masters seasons
Deutsche Tourenwagen Masters